Giovanni Maria Sforza (died 1513) was a Roman Catholic prelate who served as Archbishop of Genoa (1498–1513).

Biography
On 25 March 1498, he was appointed during the papacy of Pope Alexander VI as Archbishop of Genoa.
He served as Archbishop of Genoa until his death in 1513.

References

External links and additional sources
 (for Chronology of Bishops) 
 (for Chronology of Bishops) 

15th-century Italian Roman Catholic bishops
16th-century Italian Roman Catholic bishops
Bishops appointed by Pope Alexander VI
1513 deaths
Roman Catholic archbishops of Genoa